Museum of Genocide Victims may refer to:

 Museum of Occupations and Freedom Fights, Vilnius, Lithuania
 , see Veljko Đurić Mišina, director

See also
 Genocide
 List of Holocaust memorials and museums